Joseph Reason may refer to:

 Joseph Henry Reason (1905–1997), American librarian
 J. Paul Reason (born 1941), United States Navy admiral, son of Joseph Henry Reason